Bilinea bilineatissima is a moth of the family Erebidae first described by Michael Fibiger in 2008. It is known from southern Sri Lanka.

The species occurs in warm, moist forested mountains. Adults have been found from February to November, suggesting many generations per year.

The wingspan is 13–15 mm. The forewing is long, broad, light grey and black. The upper part of the medial area is black in a triangular patch. The underside is greyish and brown, but the underside of the forewing is dark brownish and the underside of the hindwing greyish. There is a discal spot.

References

Micronoctuini
Moths described in 2008